Meiklejohn is a surname. Notable people with the surname include:

Alexander Meiklejohn (1872–1964), philosopher, university administrator, and free-speech advocate
Andrew Meiklejohn (1899–1970), Scottish respiratory physician
David Meiklejohn (1900–1959), Scottish professional footballer
George de Rue Meiklejohn (1857–1929), Nebraska Republican politician
James Meiklejohn (born 1984), Australian rules footballer
John Miller Dow Meiklejohn (1836–1902), Scottish academic
Matthew Fontaine Maury Meiklejohn VC (1870–1913), a son of John Miller Dow Meiklejohn, British recipient of the Victoria Cross
 Arnold Hilary Meiklejohn (1874–1932), a son of John Miller Dow Meiklejohn, publisher and ornithologist
Matthew Fontaine Maury Meiklejohn MA (1913–1974), son of Arnold Hilary Meiklejohn, British professor of languages and ornithologist
Ray Meiklejohn, Canadian politician and educator
William Hope Meiklejohn, British military commander during the siege of Malakand in northern Pakistan in 1897
William Meiklejohn (1903–1981), famous Hollywood talent agent and scout in the 1920s through the 1940s

See also
Meiklejohn Civil Liberties Institute (MCLI) is a Berkeley, California-based non-profit corporation
Meiklejohn Glacier, glacier flowing southwest from the Dyer Plateau of Palmer Land to George VI Sound
Meiklejohn Stadium, ballpark in Philadelphia, Pennsylvania